The Cobb County Public Library System (CCPLS) is a system of 16 public libraries in Cobb County, Georgia, United States, excluding its second-largest city of Smyrna, which runs its own Smyrna Public Library. CobbCat.org is the online database of all CCPLS holdings.

The CCPLS uses an interlibrary loan system among all 16 branches, and allows for loan requests from other counties and areas through WorldCat. Those with a valid library card in the Cobb Country Library system can reserve materials online and pick them up in their local library. Books may be returned at any library in the system.

History

Initial libraries
Cobb County's first library was the Marietta Young Men's Debating and Library Association, which debuted in 1874. For eight years this was the sole library of the county, until the opening of the Franklin Lending Library in 1882. With two libraries now present in the county the Marietta Library Association was founded in 1883. The first library building opened on Church Street, Marietta, and was named the Sarah Freeman Clarke Library in honor of the woman who housed the initial Franklin Lending Library collection in her home. Following the opening of the Marietta Library Association, Acworth opened its first library, the Carrie Dyer Reading Club, in 1889. Austell opened its first library through the Austell Woman's Club near the end of the 1920s, and the Smyrna Public Library was founded in this decade as well.

Cobb County-Marietta Public Library Board
In 1948 the Cobb County Board of Education established the Cobb County Library, taking advantage of state matching funds in order to secure monies for books to support a future county library system. During this time, and into the early 1950s, J. Dennis Kemp became concerned about the lack of library resources in unincorporated areas of Cobb County, and went to the county commissioner to see if library outreach could be afforded to these communities. A county-appointed study committee created in 1956 began to explore the possibilities of joining the Cobb County library collection with the existing Clarke Library. The next year the committee finalized a merger, creating the Cobb County-Marietta Public Library Board, and two years later in 1959 they combined and brought the Clarke and Fort Hill libraries to the system. Prior to this acquisition the Fort Hill branch was, for many decades, the only library where blacks could go. At its inception this county library system consisted of 25,000 books with a budget of $10,500 split into thirds by the city school system, county school system, and the county government.

With the library outreach committee continuing to explore areas of Cobb County to branch into, plans were made to grow the library system. In the late 1950s the Clarke Library moved to a larger building, the old U.S. Post Office, and had two bookmobiles serving the more rural regions. Seeing the success of the library system, the library board decided to construct branch libraries in growing towns with sufficient population densities. Thus, an onslaught of new libraries joined the system.

Rapid growth for the system
In 1961 two branches in East Marietta and Powder Springs were added, and in 1962 South Cobb's previously private branch joined the system alongside the Oakdale (now Lewis A. Ray) Branch. In 1963 the Acworth Library joined, a new branch was established in Kennesaw, and Central Library moved into the building previously occupied by the old Marietta Post Office (currently the Marietta/Cobb Museum of Art). In 1964 and 1965 the Gritters and Sweetwater Valley branches respectively joined the system. 

With a rapidly growing number of branches, a 1965 voters' referendum authorized $985,000 of library bonds to be divided into library construction, land purchases, books, supplies, and equipment for the system. Due to this bond, from 1966 to 1969 seven new libraries were added: Kennesaw, East Marietta, Acworth, South Cobb, Sibley, Lewis A. Ray, and Powder Springs. All seven opened on the same day in 1967, and were met with public approval.

With such a large number of libraries representing much more than just Marietta, the system changed its name to the present-day Cobb County Public Library System in 1969. The Stratton branch was added in 1974, and the Merchant's Walk branch was added in 1979. In 1978 taxpayers overwhelmingly approved a $7.16 million library issue to renovate and expand the Switzer (then Central) library to 64,000 square feet, and construct the Kemp Memorial Library, Mountain View Library, and Vinings Library. The money was also used to renovate the Kennesaw and Powder Springs branches. By the early 1980s the system had grown to fourteen libraries with an annual budget of $1.5 million and passed one million materials circulated annually. The Fort Hill library was rededicated as the Hattie G. Wilson library in memory of the late librarian's 33 years of service. The final two libraries added to the sixteen-branch system were the Mountain View and Vinings libraries, constructed in 1989 and 1990 respectively.

During the 1990s the population of Cobb County began to grow rapidly. The speed of the system's growth was unable to meet the needs of the growing population, and the amount of books in the collection dropped below one book per citizen. In July 1991 the Friends of the Library and the CCPLS urged the passage of a new $7.06 million bond referendum in order to provide enough books to meet the success of neighboring library systems. Ultimately this bond referendum did not pass by 814 out of 60,000 votes.

Modern years

The Cobb County Library System has continued to see growth into the 21st century. In 2002 a library in West Cobb opened, and in 2005 the South Cobb Regional Library opened. In 2007 a new building was secured in Powder Springs, and their town library moved to its new location on Atlanta Road.

In 2010 the East Cobb Library replaced the previously built Merchant's Walk Library and doubled the amount of floor space for books and technological improvements. While interest in libraries in this area of Cobb County was high, the Hattie G. Wilson (formerly Fort Hill) library began to show signs of disuse. Citing a 50% loss of circulation, the Wilson Library was unanimously voted to shut down in 2013.

Another renovation was approved in 2016 when the East Marietta Library was chosen for a new location and new building. This new facility, the Sewell Mill Library and Cultural Center, opened on December 4, 2017 at a cost of $10.6 million. It was built in conjunction with the Cobb County Parks Department, and, in addition to a large collection of books, also has a black box theater, open-air amphitheater, art galleries and classrooms, and many individual and group conference rooms.

Public libraries

Library systems in neighboring counties
Bartow County Library System to the northwest
Sequoyah Regional Library System to the north
Atlanta-Fulton Public Library System to the south and east
West Georgia Regional Library System to the south and west

References

External links
CCPLS official website and catalog

Buildings and structures in Cobb County, Georgia
Cobb
Education in Cobb County, Georgia
Public libraries in Georgia (U.S. state)